Two in One or 2-in-1 or variant may refer to:

 Two in One (film), a 2007 Russian film
 "Two in One", a 2016 song by Sonja Vectomov
 Marvel Two-in-One, an American comic book series
 Canon: Two in One, a musical term
 2-in-1 PC, a cross between a tablet computer and a laptop
 Multi-function printer, a 2-in-1 printer, the 2-function versions which combines a printer with some other device, typically a scanner
 Two-in-one (juggling)

See also
 One in Two – Two in One (1979 album), album by Max Roach
 2 of One (1989 album), a video album by Metallica
 Two to One (1978 album), album by Thelma Houston
 Two Is One (1974 album), album by Charles Rouse
 Two Is One, 2003 album by Andromeda